Waterford is a village located on and around St. Paul Street in North Smithfield, Rhode Island and Blackstone, Massachusetts.  The Blackstone River and Branch River converge just south of the village.  

Waterford was developed in 1824 by Welcome Farnum, a Yankee entrepreneur, who purchased land, built a dam on the Branch River, and constructed the first textile mill called Red Mill.  He named the village Waterford because many of the Irish workers in his mill came from Waterford, Ireland.  The last mills in the area were constructed mid-nineteenth century. Waterford is home to St. Paul's Church (1851), originally served a largely Irish population, and sits on the Rhode Island/Massachusetts border. Adjacent to the church is the church school and many businesses.

See also
Farnum's Gate Historic District, encompassing part of the Massachusetts side of the village

External links and references
Walter Nebiker, The History of North Smithfield (Somersworth, NH: New England History Press, 1976).

Villages in Providence County, Rhode Island
Villages in Rhode Island
Villages in Massachusetts
Villages in Worcester County, Massachusetts
Blackstone, Massachusetts